The 1912 Connecticut gubernatorial election was held on November 5, 1912. Incumbent Democrat Simeon Eben Baldwin defeated Republican nominee J. P. Studley with 41.11% of the vote.

General election

Candidates
Major party candidates
Simeon Eben Baldwin, Democratic
J. P. Studley, Republican

Other candidates
Herbert Smith, Progressive
Samuel E. Beardsley, Socialist
B. B. Bassette, Prohibition
Charles B. Wells, Socialist Labor

Results

References

1912
Connecticut
Gubernatorial